2700 West Sugar Factory Road station, sometimes referred to as simply 2700 West, is a light rail station in the West Jordan, Utah, in the United States, served by the Red Line of the Utah Transit Authority's (UTA) TRAX light rail system. The Red Line provides service from the University of Utah to the Daybreak community of South Jordan.

Description
The station is located at 8351 South 2700 West and is accessible from 2700 West at 8350 South (just north of West Sugar Factory Road). The station has a free Park and Ride lot with total of about 200 parking spaces available, but there are plans for more than 400 parking spaces. In the early planning stages the station was and is referred to as "2700 West Station", but later changed to the current name. Train schedules and maps often still refer to the station as simple "2700 West". Notwithstanding, the signage at the station (the Park and Ride and the passenger platform) indicates "8351 S. 2700 W." The station opened August 7, 2011, as part of the Red Line (Mid-Jordan) and is operated by the Utah Transit Authority.

References

TRAX (light rail) stations
Railway stations in the United States opened in 2011
Railway stations in Salt Lake County, Utah
2011 establishments in Utah